Sibabalo 'Fudge' Qoma (born ) is a South African rugby union player for the  in the Pro14. His regular position is lock.

References

1997 births
Living people
Free State Cheetahs players
Griffons (rugby union) players
Griquas (rugby union) players
Rugby union locks
Rugby union players from East London, Eastern Cape
South African rugby union players
Cheetahs (rugby union) players